Zabrđe (Serbian Cyrillic: Забрђе) is a village located in the Ugljevik municipality in Republika Srpska, Bosnia and Herzegovina.

Population

Ethnic composition, 1991 census

At the 1991 census, the total population was 1,725. There were 1,706 Serbs (98.89%),  7 "Yugoslavs" (0.40%), 2 Croats (0.11%), and 10 (0.57%) who were either of other or unknown origin.

References

 Official results from the book: Ethnic composition of Bosnia-Herzegovina population, by municipalities and settlements, 1991. census, Zavod za statistiku Bosne i Hercegovine - Bilten no.234, Sarajevo 1991.

Ugljevik
Villages in Republika Srpska